Farzaneh Aghaeipour is an Iranian playwright, author, and activist. She is a board member at the politically active Iranian Writers Association, which fights censorship and advocates freedom of expression. 
Her major works include historical plays and novels on recent Iranian political history.
In a 2006 tour of North America, Aghaeipour spoke at the Ontario Institute for Studies in Education (a teacher's college which is part of the University of Toronto), on September 9, 2006 and later that month at Université du Québec à Montréal.

Publicatioans
 Sattār-i Qarahʹdāghī : namāyishnāmah, 1991 (in Persian)
 Pārk-i Atābak : namāyishnāmah, 1991 (in Persian)
 Hunar va davarī, 1999 (in Persian)
 Riz̤a Khān dar yak namāyish-i ʻajīb, 1999 (in Persian)

References

External links
  د’رگل .
 List of Farzaneh Aghaeipour's published works
 Farzaneh Aghaeipour's Biography
 Theatre Directors: Farzaneh Aghaeipour, Parstimes
  Iran newspaper.

Iranian writers
Iranian dramatists and playwrights
Iranian women writers
Year of birth missing (living people)
Living people
Women dramatists and playwrights
Iranian Writers Association members